Hannah Stacey from St Eval in Cornwall, is the current UK women's free-diving record holder.

She was also stunt double for Kelly Brook in the film Fishtales, in which she wore a complete mermaid costume in scenes requiring advanced diving techniques.

In 2004 she was World Female Freediver of the Year.

Records held
UK Constant Weight UK Record: 54 metres 
UK Dynamic Apnea Record: 119 metres

External links

 Pure Blue Freediver Hannah Stacey
http://www.bbc.co.uk/cornwall/extremesports/stories/nov_2004/freediving.shtml

References

Living people
Sportspeople from Cornwall
Year of birth missing (living people)